This is a list of urban theorists notable in their field, in alphabetical order:

 Christopher Alexander (1936-2022)
 Donald Appleyard (1928-1982)
 Michael E. Arth
 Christopher Charles Benninger (1942)
 Walter Block (1941)
 Ernest Burgess (1886-1966)
 Peter Calthorpe (1949)
 Manuel Castells (1942)
 Ildefons Cerdà (1815-1876)
 Gordon Cullen (1914-1994)
 Mike Davis (1946)
 Constantinos Doxiadis (1914-1975)
 Andrés Duany (1949)
 Richard Florida
 John Friedmann
 Joel Garreau
 Patrick Geddes (1854-1932)
 Jan Gehl
 Paul Goodman
 Percival Goodman (1904-1989)
 Adam Greenfield
 Peter Hall (1932-2014)
 David Harvey
 Ebenezer Howard (1850-1928)
 Arata Isozaki
 Allan Jacobs (1928)
 Jane Jacobs (1916-2006)
 Kiyonori Kikutake (1928-2011)
 Rem Koolhaas (1944)
 Kisho Kurokawa (1934-2007)
 Fumihiko Maki
 James Howard Kunstler
 Le Corbusier (1887-1965)
 Loretta Lees
 Henri Lefebvre (1901-1991)
 Jiří Löw
 Kevin A. Lynch (1918-1984)
 Rob Krier (1938)
 Richard L. Meier (1920-2007)
 Lewis Mumford (1895-1990)
 Saverio Muratori (1910-1973)
 Clarence Perry (1872-1944)
 Elizabeth Plater-Zyberk
 Miguel Robles-Durán
 Witold Rybczynski
 Thomas Sieverts
 Camillo Sitte (1843-1903)
 Edward Soja (1940-2015)
 Ignasi de Solà-Morales (1942-2001)
 Kenzo Tange (1913-2005)
 Robert Venturi (1925-2018)
 William H. Whyte (1917-1999)
 Frank Lloyd Wright (1867-1959)
 Sharon Zukin (1946)

See also 

 Index of urban planning articles
 Index of urban studies articles
 List of urban planners
 Urban design
 Urban geography
 Urban economics
 Urban sociology
 Urban studies

References 

Urban theorists
Urban